The Church of St Luke is a Church of England Grade II* listed church located in the centre of Wallsend, North Tyneside, next to Station Road.

History
Due to an increase of the population in Wallsend, supported by both coalmining and shipbuilding industries, the parish of St Peter, Wallsend was divided in 1887, with the western portion becoming the new parish of St Luke, complete with a new church.

The foundation stone was laid in 1885, and the building was consecrated in 1887, although construction was not completed until 1906.

One of the key donors to the new building was George B. Hunter, then managing partner of the Swan Hunter shipbuilding company. The long association between the church and the company (whose yard is just down Station Road) saw St Luke's nicknamed the ‘Shipyard Church’.

In 2001 the parish was merged with that of St Peter, Wallsend, reuniting the original parish and the two sister churches.

Tradition
The church was founded in the Anglo-Catholic mould. Indeed, during the incumbency of the second vicar, Fr William O'Brady-Jones, Anglo-Catholic practices were listed in evidence given to the Royal Commission on Ecclesiastical Discipline in 1904. But after his departure 1908, with the then Bishop of Newcastle being unsympathetic to Anglo-Catholics, a Low Churchman was appointed. The High Church tradition lay dormant until Fr Colin Turnbull, who began his ministry as an assistant curate at St Peter's, Wallsend, was made vicar.

Stained Glass
Inside, the church's most striking feature is the magnificent east Window. It portrays the Crucifixion, and was unveiled in 1922 as a memorial to the men of the parish who died on active service during the First World War. Designed by the artist Wilhelmina Geddes, it has been widely lauded and described by Nikolaus Pevsner as of ‘quite exceptionally high quality’ and is regarded as one of her finest works.

Other notable features 
The church's architecture is in the Early English Gothic style, designed by Oliver, Leeson & Wood, and the tower is an easily recognisable landmark on the Wallsend skyline. Originally it was meant to be even taller, with a spire on top: however, quicksand below prevented this being carried out.

The pipe organ is by Abbott and Smith of Leeds, and its specification is detailed at the National Pipe Organ Register.

The vestries at the west end of the church are a memorial to Kathleen O'Brady-Jones, the eldest daughter of Fr O’Brady-Jones. She was accidentally shot during a rehearsal for an entertainment organised by the church in the nearby Co-op Hall, by a boy who had bought a revolver in the Bigg Market in Newcastle: whilst showing it to his friends the gun fired and Kathleen was killed.

The Anglican church in Wallsend, New South Wales, also a suburb of Newcastle, NSW, is dedicated to St Luke, following the dedication of this St Luke's.

Clergy

Vicars of Wallsend St Luke
 1887-1892  W.S. Wrenford
 1892-1908  William O'Brady-Jones
 1908-1912  R. Nicholson
 1912-1923  T.W. Allen
 1923-1933  A. Simpson
 1933-1943  J.H. Johnston
 1943-1952  Robert McCaughey
 1953-1958  Donald MacNaughton
 1958-1968  Colin Turnbull
 1969-1971  John Clay
 1971-1989  Peter Heywood
 1990-1996  John Inge
 1996-2001  Richard Deadman
Rectors of Wallsend St Peter & St Luke
 2001-2011  Michael Vine
 2012-2019  David Sudron

Assistant Curates
 1937-1941 Arthur Donnelly
 1947-1949 Matthew Hodgson
 1949-1951 Jack Walker
 1952-1955 Peter Rendell
 1953-1954 George Betts
 1955-1960 Bernard Mather
 1957-1958 Ralph Knight
 1960-1963 Lionel Trevor Eddershaw
 1961-1964 Richard Hicks
 1963-1967 David Rogerson
 1965-1968 Keith Ward
 1967-1969 Richard Kingsbury
 1969-1970 Thomas Stevens
 1971 William Golightly
 1973-1976 Howard Smith
 1976-1979 Michael Vine
 1979-1982 Stephen Pickering
 1982-1983 Richard Hill
 1983-1986 Iain Young
 1988-1991 Neil Wilson
 1991-1995 Samuel Wells
 1994-2002 Andrew Elder
 1995-1997 Sheila Hamil (deacon)
 2006-2007 Stephen Gillham
 2016-2020 Endre Kormos

Today

Following large-scale alterations to the building in 2009–10, the church has become a home for many of the community gatherings which met in the old church hall.  The west end of the church has been augmented and converted into halls and a kitchen that play host to a number of community groups. Also, the vestries are home to the Walking With Project, a charity set up by Wallsend Churches Working Together that supports asylum seekers and refugees in the North Tyneside area.

References

Churches completed in 1887
Wallsend
19th-century Church of England church buildings
Wallsend